Swamp holly is a common name for several hollies and may refer to:

 Ilex amelanchier, the swamp holly proper
 Ilex decidua (meadow holly)
 Ilex verticillata (American winterberry), native to eastern North America